The Syrian Arab Red Crescent (SARC) ( Al-Hilal al-Aḥmar al-Arabi al-Souri) is a humanitarian nonprofit organization. Its headquarters are in the Syrian capital city of Damascus. The society was founded in Damascus, Syria in 1942, and admitted to the International Committee of the Red Cross (ICRC) in 1946. Some of founders included were Abdul-Kader Zahra, Jamil Kabara, Sami Al-Meedani, Shafiq Diyab, Mustafa Shawky, Ahmed Kadary, Wade Saydawy, Mounib Rifai, and others.  The society is part of the International Federation and has been recognized by the  ICRC. The SARC has 14 branches all over Syria and 75 sub-branches. Volunteer based, the SARC has around 11,000 trained volunteers that work in the areas of first aid, first aid training, disaster response and relief, psycho-social support, and health in general. SARC also partners with local charity organizations and works with the relevant components of the Syrian community, with UN agencies and NGOs.

The organization is working in the Syrian civil war and is engaged in evacuation of people from war torn region to other places. It is shifting people and militants who surrender and relocating them to other places. When Darayya surrendered to government forces, the militants were relocated by the Red Crescent.

SARC volunteers and hospitals have been the targets of numerous attacks since the beginning of the Syrian civil war. In 2016 a UN aid convoy composed mostly of SARC workers driving near Urum al-Kubra was bombed, killing at least 12 SARC drivers and destroying aid supplies in a warehouse. According to the ICRC 20 civilians were also killed in the attack. UN Secretary General Ban Ki-moon condemned the attack and temporarily suspended UN aid convoys after the attack. A UN investigation carried out by the Independent International Commission of Inquiry on the Syrian Arab Republic found that the Syrian government deliberately carried out the attack on the aid convoy which they allege amounts to a potential war crime.

See also
 International Committee of the Red Cross
 International Red Cross and Red Crescent Movement

References

External links
 Syrian Arab Red Crescent

1942 establishments in Mandatory Syria
Red Cross and Red Crescent national societies
Medical and health organizations based in Syria
Organizations established in 1942